Ann Saunderson (born Ann Karen Joy Nanton in Birmingham) is a British dance music singer.

Biography

Early career
Ann Nanton met Kevin Saunderson when she went to join her older sister Judy in London in 1987. (Judy was already a session singer). Soon afterward, she married him and moved to the US, appearing on several of his recordings as a vocalist. She also recorded under the aliases Surreal and Karen Joy, and was lead vocalist of dance group Kaos. She also worked with Inner City, her husband's band.

Career
One of Saunderson's most famous contributions to Inner City was its 1992 hit, "Pennies From Heaven." As Sürreal, in 1994 Saunderson covered Pearls (from the Love Deluxe album) by Sade. The late 1990s were rather inactive, and it was only in 2000 that Saunderson began to record with new acts. In the early 2000s, she worked with the American techno band Octave One.  She provided guest vocals on two of its single releases, "Blackwater" and "Somedays." All of these projects were large club hits and had great critical success, especially the former. Saunderson was also featured on tracks on Octave One's debut album.  Additionally, she provided vocals for singles by Slam ("Lie to Me" (2004)), Dave Lee ("You're Not Alone" (2006)), Notenshun ("Move a Little Closer" (2007)), and, more recently, Andre Crom & Chi Thanh ("These Walls" (2014))

Discography
With Kaos:
"Definition Of Love," 1989
"Gonna Get Over U," 1990
"Freedom Of Choice," 1995

As Karen Joy:
"Talk to Me," 1992

As Surreal:
"Happiness"
"Pearls," 1994

As Ann Saunderson:
"Blackwater" (Octave One featuring Ann Saunderson), 2001. UK #47
"Blackwater" (remix) (Octave One featuring Ann Saunderson), 2002. UK #69
 "Lie To Me" (Slam featuring Ann Saunderson), August 2004.
 "Somedays" (Octave One featuring Ann Saunderson), March 2005.
 "You're Not Alone" (Dave Lee featuring Ann Saunderson), January 2006.
 "Move A Little Closer" (Notenshun featuring Ann Saunderson), May 2007.
 "Lose Yourself" (Surkin featuring Ann Saunderson), November 2011.
 "R.L.H." (Supernova featuring Ann Saunderson), December 2013.

References

External links

1967 births
Living people
English women singers
English house musicians
People from Birmingham, West Midlands